Brooks Brown is an American saxophonist and former member of the Cherry Poppin' Daddies.

Brooks Brown may also refer to: 

 Brooks Brown (author), American author of No Easy Answers: the Truth Behind Death at Columbine
 Brooks Brown (baseball) (born 1985), American baseball pitcher for the Colorado Rockies